A customer review is an evaluation of a product or service made by someone who has purchased and used, or had experience with, a product or service. Customer reviews are a form of customer feedback on electronic commerce and online shopping sites. There are also dedicated review sites, some of which use customer reviews as well as or instead of professional reviews. The reviews may themselves be graded for usefulness or accuracy by other users.

History
Before the advent of the internet, methods by which customers could review products and services included customer comment boxes and customer service helplines. These methods are still in existence today although internet review sites have grown significantly in recent years.

Reliability 
The reliability of customer reviews has been questioned. Abuses akin to ballot stuffing of favourable reviews by the seller (known as incentivized reviews), or negative reviews by competitors, need to be policed by the review host site. Indeed, gathering fake reviews has become big business. In 2012, for example, fake book reviews have been revealed as significantly affecting ratings on Amazon. In 2016 Amazon banned the practice of reviewing complimentary products, researchers have shown that the process still continued as of 2021, but without any disclosures.

Since few sites restrict users to reviewing only items they have actually purchased, it is difficult to know if a customer is real, has actually used the product they are reviewing, and is giving honest, unbiased feedback about the product or services being reviewed. Tools like Fakespot and ReviewMeta can help spot fake reviews on shopping sites like Amazon. Unfortunately, the tools do not work on most other websites that show customer reviews.

Public calls have been growing stronger, demanding that review sites be held accountable for publishing fake reviews. Most recently (June 2021), the Competition and Markets Authority (CMA) in the United Kingdom has launched an investigation into whether Amazon and Google are doing enough to prevent fake reviews from being published on their sites. Both businesses claim to have sufficient resources and policies in place to prevent fake reviews from being published. Legal steps could be taken against the giants if CMA determines those claims to be false.

In the meantime, 87% of consumers who read online reviews  are left guessing, whether the reviews they base their purchasing choices on are real or fake as very few online review sites are able (or willing) to guarantee the authenticity of their reviews. One approach to ensuring authenticity is allowing reviews by invitation only. Businesses who collect their customers’ contact information invite only those customers to leave a review on a site that does not publish unsolicited reviews. One such site is RealPatientRatings, which specializes in physician reviews. Invitation-only review sites only publish reviews written by consumers who actually visited the establishment or bought the product they’re reviewing. By excluding people – and bots – who never actually visited the business, fake reviews from fake customers are completely eliminated. Since more businesses collect their clients’ contact information, invitation-only reviews might just be the solution to the fake reviews problem.

Whether a customer receives an invitation or not, many businesses have expressed the wish that customers let the business know in the moment if some aspect of their interaction or product is unsatisfactory, so they can have the opportunity to fix it on the spot or provide compensation, rather than customers leaving unnecessarily disappointed and writing negative reviews.

Fake review scandals 
In 2010, British historian Orlando Figes posted reviews on Amazon praising his own work and criticizing that of his rivals.

In August 2012, The New York Times revealed that John Locke had paid an online service to write reviews of his books, in order to artificially boost sales.

In 2022, researchers from UCLA documented that millions of Amazon sellers purchase fake 5-star reviews through private Facebook groups.

Spoof reviews 

Humorous customer reviews are common on some major shopping sites, such as Amazon. These are often ironically or sarcastically praising reviews of products deemed kitsch or mundane. Another example is methylated spirits described in the style of a wine review. A product may become an internet meme attracting large numbers of spoof reviews, which may boost its sales. Famous examples include Tuscan Whole Milk and the Three Wolf Moon T-shirt.

Examples of spoof reviews include:
 A Million Random Digits with 100,000 Normal Deviates (book)
 f.lux (display color adjustment software based on the time of day)
 Osama Bin Laden's Hideout Compound (humorous reviews of Osama bin Laden's hideout compound written by Google Maps users after his killing on 1 May 2011) 
 Uranium Ore
 "BIC Cristal For Her Ball Pen"

British spoofers have targeted several build to order novelty products made by Media Storehouse from two million licensed photo library images, including a canvas print of minor celebrity Paul Ross, and a jigsaw puzzle of Nick Humby, a former finance director of Manchester United.

Review sites

Major review sites include:

Amazon
Angie's List
Barnes & Noble
Bazaarvoice (retailers)
Better Business Bureau
CNet (technology)
https://www.ekomi.com/us/ (brands, provider of authentic, verified, transaction-based reviews and ratings.)
Epicurious (recipes)
Epinions
Judy's Book
MerchantCircle
MouthShut.com (Hotels, restaurants, travel, automobile, electronics, home appliances, books, employers etc.)
PowerReviews (brands, retailers)
PowerReviews (brands, retailers)
Qype (focuses on local businesses)
Resellerratings (retailers)
TestFreaks (product reviews)
TripAdvisor (hotels, restaurants and visitor attractions)
Trustpilot (retailers)
Yelp!
ZocDoc (doctors)
https://www.techostory.com/ (Gadget Reviews, Specifications, & Updates)

Google reviews 
With its dominance in search, reviews became a logical progression in Google's product roadmap. Google's interest with reviews peaked in 2002 when it purchased the remaining business assets of review pioneer Deja, integrating much of their content into its own ecosphere. Over time Google changed to include reviews with searches which related to products and businesses, even allowing users to leave reviews.

In later years, Google's integration with Android devices also allowed them to capitalise on their own products including reviews, facilitating the prominence and reliability of reviews from a large portion of smartphone users.

Business owners who sign up to access the Google My Business service are able to prompt their customers to leave reviews directly from the Google My Business control panel. Businesses collecting reviews from Google also receive a boost to their search engine optimisation from positive customer feedback on Google as well as other numerous benefits both online and off.

Google sources reviews and ratings from 30 independent review partners.

References

Review websites